Who'll Come A-Waltzing is a 1963 Australian comedy play by South African born Peggy Caine who had emigrated to Australia three years previously. The premise of the play was about British migrants in Australia.

It was staged by J. C Williamson's in the major cities of Australia, at a time when that company rarely put on Australian plays. It was adapted for radio in Australia, England and New Zealand.

It was first performed for radio in 1962.

The original production featured Campbell Copelin and Marion Johns.

References

External links
Who'll Come a Waltzing at Ausstage
Original program at Museum Victoria

Australian plays
1963 plays